Radio RSA: The Voice of South Africa was the international broadcasting service of the Republic of South Africa.  It was run by the South African Broadcasting Corporation from its inception on 1 May 1966 until its demise in 1992 following the end of the apartheid era. Radio RSA broadcast news and opinion programming that was mostly pro-government, and the message of its broadcasts reflected those views. Following the fall of the apartheid government, the service was renamed Channel Africa.

Management
Radio RSA, as part of the South African Broadcasting Corporation, was originally part of the Department of Information, which was established after the National Party's victory in the 1948 South African general election.

The Department of Information's task was to promote the image of South Africa internationally and reduce criticism of apartheid. After the Muldergate scandal of the late 1970s, the functions of the Department of Information were split. The Department of Foreign Affairs took over control of Radio RSA. The annual budget was about 20 million rands. 

In 1976, Radio RSA transmitted for 36 hours a week. Radio RSA broadcast in 12 languages in 1976  including English, French, Portuguese, and Afrikaans. In 1984, 11 languages were broadcast.

Facilities
The studios of Radio RSA were initially located at Broadcast House, Commissioner Street in Johannesburg, relocating to Auckland Park in 1976. Additional facilities were located in Bloemendal near Meyerton, Gauteng. 

Transmitters operated at 100, 250 and 500 kW power.

Identification
The station identification in English was “"This is Radio RSA, the Voice of South Africa, from Johannesburg", with similar announcements in other languages: "Ici R. RSA, la Voix de l'Afrique de Sud".

In 1992, following the fall of apartheid and the election of an ANC government, the service was renamed Channel Africa.

References

International broadcasters
1966 establishments in South Africa
1992 disestablishments in South Africa
Radio stations in Johannesburg
Radio stations established in 1966
Radio stations disestablished in 1992
Defunct radio stations in South Africa
State media